The Battle of Palo Alto was the first major battle of the Mexican–American War and was fought on May 8, 1846, on disputed ground five miles (8 km) from the modern-day city of Brownsville, Texas. A force of some 3,700 Mexican troops – most of the Army of The North – led by General Mariano Arista engaged a force of approximately 2,300 United States troops – the Army of Occupation led by General Zachary Taylor.

On April 30, following the Thornton Affair, Mexican General Mariano Arista's troops began to cross the Rio Grande. On May 3, the troops began to besiege the American outpost at Fort Texas. Taylor marched his Army of Occupation south to relieve the siege. Arista, upon learning of his approach, diverted many of his units away from the siege to meet Taylor's force. The battle took place on May 8, three days before the formal declaration of war on Mexico by the United States. Arista ordered two cavalry charges, first against the American right flank and later against the left. Both were unsuccessful. The American victory is widely attributed to superior artillery, as the U.S. "light" artillery was much more mobile and accurate than that of the Mexican forces.

That evening, Arista was forced to withdraw further south. The armies clashed again the next day at the Battle of Resaca de la Palma.

Background

The Americans ended up ensconced at what came to be known as Fort Brown right across the Rio Grande from Matamoros. On April 24, Arista arrived at Matamoros, having sent General Anastasio Torrejon with a portion of the army across the river to a point a few miles up the river from Matamoros. His plan was to throw troops across the Rio Grande, above and below the positions occupied by the Americans, and advancing to Point Isabel: the base of Taylor’s supply line on the Atlantic Coast, cut off Taylor from his supply line forcing him into an engagement.  

After having dispatched Torrejon, Arista marched with the remainder of the troops and twelve pieces of artillery to Longoreño about five leagues east down the river. Leaving Francisco Mejia with only a small garrison in command at Matamoros.  

The crossing at Longoreño was long delayed due to a lack of boats thus reducing Arista’s element of surprise, but Taylor was already on to him. The fact that Torrejon had crossed the river and was already further up west was discovered when Captain Thornton and his dragoons who had been sent up the river, fell into an ambuscade and were captured, which came to be known as the Thornton Affair. Later Taylor received intelligence that Mexican forces were preparing to cross the river below his position and not believing that Arista would make a direct assault on his fortified camp, concluded that Point Isabel was the true target.  

On May 1st, Taylor left his camp well fortified and marched toward Point Isabel which he reached the following day. Meanwhile Arista was crossing the river with his army and received intelligence that Taylor was anticipating his moves. He then gave orders for the batteries at Matamoros to fire upon Fort Brown and sent Pedro de Ampudia with four guns to besiege it. The cannonade began at five in the morning on May 3rd. Meanwhile Arista united his forces with those of Torrejon and took up a position at Palo Alto east of Point Isabel and North of Fort Brown thus cutting off communications between Fort Brown and Point Isabel. Taylor and his troops however heard the shelling of Fort Brown and Captain Walker was sent with a small cavalry escort to make contact with Fort Brown. By making a very wide turn he evaded Arista and then hid his men in the chaparral making his way alone by night to Fort Brown only to discover that the American troops there were enduring the bombardment with little damage. By the morning of May 5th, he was back at Point Isabel with this news.   

Taylor now determined to go to the relief of the fort with supplies of ordnance and provisions and on the 7th now set off again for Matamoros with two thousand three hundred men. On May 8th at around noon Taylor’s forces crossed paths with Arista’s forces and both began to prepare for battle.

Battle

Facing north and moving left to right, General Arista's army consisted of General Antonio Canales Rosillo's 400 irregular cavalry in chaparral, Anastasio Torrejon's cavalry brigade consisting of the 8th, 7th and Light Cavalry, astride the Point Isabel road, then came General Jose Maria Garcia's brigade of the 4th and 10th Infantry with two 8-pounders, then General Rómulo Díaz de la Vega's brigade of the 10th and 6th Infantry with five 4-pounders, then the Tampico Corps, the 2d Light Infantry and a sapper battalion with a 4-pounder. Behind this line was Col. Cayetano Montero's light cavalry.

Facing south and moving right to left, Taylor, with a force of 2,300 men and 400 wagons, placed Col. David E. Twiggs with Lt. Col. James S. McIntosh's 5th Infantry and Maj. Samuel Ringgold's artillery battery, followed by Capt. Lewis N. Morris' 3d Infantry with Lt. William H. Churchill's two 18-pounders astride the road, followed by Capt. George W. Allen's 4th Infantry, Lt. Thomas Childs' artillery battalion, Lt. Col. William G. Belknap's wing, James Duncan's battery, then Capt. William R. Montgomery's 8th Infantry on the American left. Lt. Col. Charles A. May's dragoon squadron guarded the left flank and Capt. Croghan Ker guarded the train. Montgomery was slightly wounded during the battle, along with approximately ten other officers, some of them severely.

Taylor halted his columns and formed a line behind his batteries when the Mexican artillery started firing at 2 PM central daylight time.  The American artillery was very effective while the Mexican artillery often fell short.  Arista ordered Torrejon's cavalry to attack the American right, but progress was slow, allowing Twiggs to form the 5th Infantry into a square to meet them with a couple of volleys.

A fire started from a cannon burning wad which halted fighting for an hour as the smoke paralleled between the lines of the opposing forces. Arista pulled back 1,000 yards on his left and Taylor advanced accordingly, rotating the axis of the battle 40 degrees counterclockwise. May failed to turn the Mexican left before the artillery duel resumed. Child's artillery battalion formed a square to repel another Torrejon cavalry charge. Duncan's battery stopped Arista from turning the American left and then advanced with the 8th Infantry and Ker's dragoons to drive the Mexican right from the field. A charge ordered by Arista at this time resulted in the light cavalry fleeing along the Mexican line, taking the 6th Infantry with them. Fighting stopped with dusk and both armies camped for the night.

Aftermath
The morning of the 9th revealed the Mexican army slowly moving south. Taylor sent forward a 220-man battalion under McCall to reconnoiter the Mexican positions. The Battle of Resaca de la Palma would follow.

Major Ringgold was struck by a cannon ball and mortally wounded during the battle but Ringgold's and Duncan's effective cannoneers with their "Flying Artillery"—the tactic of using light artillery to attack then quickly move to another location and fire once more, carried the day and won the battle for the Americans. General Zachary Taylor emerged from the war a national hero.

The battlefield is now Palo Alto Battlefield National Historical Park and is maintained by the National Park Service. 

The State of Iowa named its counties soon after the battle, and several Iowa counties are named in honor of the battle and its participants, including Palo Alto, Ringgold, Page, and Taylor. The city of Palo, Iowa was also named for the battle.

Order of battle

Mexican
Army of the North – Gen.div. Mariano Arista
 Deputy – Gen.br. Pedro Ampudia

Infantry
 1st Brigade – Gen. Jose M. Garcia
 10th Line – Col. Jose M. Garcia, Bn.Comdte. Manuel Montero
 Artillery battery (2x 8-lb)
 2nd Brigade - Gen. Rómulo Díaz de la Vega
 1st Line – Col. Nicolas Mendoza
 6th Line – Lt. Col. F. Garcia Casanova
 Artillery battery (6x 4-lb)
 Brigade – Gen. Pedro Ampudia
 4th Line – Col. Jose Lopez Uraga
 Villas of the North Cavalry Auxiliary
 Sappers Company
 Artillery battery (2x 6-lb ?)
 Unassigned
 2nd Light – Col. Jose Maria Carrasco, Lt.Col. M. Fernandez
 Tampico Coast Guards Battalion – Lt. Col. Ramon Tabera
 Zapadores (Sappers) Battalion – Lt. Col. Mariano Reyes

Cavalry
 Cavalry Brigade – Acting Gen. Anastasio Torrejon
 7th & 8th Line – Col. A. Torrejon?
 Light Regiment of Mexico – Col. C. Montero
 Presidential Companies – Col. Sabariego
 Artillery battery (2x 4-lb guns)
 Irregular Cavalry (Rancheros) – Gen.br. A. Canales

Artillery – Gen. Tomas Requena
 Chief of div. Raphael Linarte
 Artillery battery (2x 8-lb, 2x 6-lb)
 Artillery battery (4x 4-lb) – Capt. Ballarta?
 Artillery battery (4x 4-lb)

American
Army of Occupation – Brig. Gen. Zachary Taylor

1st Brigade "Left Wing" – Lt. Col. William G. Belknap
 Artillery Battalion (acting as Infantry) – Lt. Col. Thomas Childs
 Battery A, 2nd U.S. Artillery – Capt. James Duncan
 8th Infantry – Capt. William R. Montgomery
 Wagon Train – Capts. George H. Crosman & Abraham C. Myers

2nd Brigade "Right Wing" – Colonel David E. Twiggs
 5th Infantry – Lt. Col. James S. McIntosh
 Battery C, 3rd U.S. Artillery – Samuel Ringgold (mw)
 3rd Infantry – Capt. Lewis M. Morris
 Artillery battery (2x 18-lb) – Lt. William H. Churchill
 4th Infantry – Maj. George W. Allen
 2nd Dragoons – Capts. Croghan Ker & Charles A. May

Fort Polk
Zachary Taylor established Fort Polk, near Point Isabel, 23 miles northeast of present day Brownsville, with a Gulf of Mexico pass suitable for ships' landings, on March 24, 1846 as a supply base for his operations leading up to the Battle of Palo Alto, and used it until 1850. He garrisoned it with two artillery companies under Major John Munroe. Major Charles Thomas was the Depot Quartermaster using wagons and river steamers to supply Taylor.

Taylor established camps for those heeding his call for volunteers at Point Isabel, the north end of Brazos Island, and along the Rio Grande between Barita and Fort Brown, at a place known as Camp Belknap.

Gallery

See also
 Battles of the Mexican–American War
 List of conflicts in the United States
 Hispanic Heritage Sites (U.S. National Park Service)
 Saint Patrick's Battalion

Notes

References

Bibliography
 
    (eBook)
 
 
 
 

Additional Reading
 Chartrand, René. "Santa Anna's Mexican Army, 1821–1848"
 Crawford, Mark. "Encyclopedia of the Mexican-American War"

External links
 Palo Alto Battlefield National Historic Site
 "Taking a Stand at Palo Alto," a Documentary on the Battle of Palo Alto
 Guns Along the Rio Grande: Palo Alto and Resaca de la Palma, CMH Pub 73-2, Center of Military History
 A Continent Divided: The U.S. - Mexico War, Center for Greater Southwestern Studies, the University of Texas at Arlington

1846 in Mexico
Palo Alto
Cameron County, Texas
Palo Alto
Irish-American history and culture in Texas
Zachary Taylor
May 1846 events
1846 in the Mexican-American War
Palo Alto